Battle of Opatów may refer to:

 Battle of Opatów (1863)
 Battle of Opatów (1864)